Fu, sometimes translated as prefecture or superior prefecture, was a type of administrative division in historical China from Tang dynasty to Qing dynasty. Fu was a level between provinces or equivalent divisions and counties. The term was initially applied to larger or more important prefectures, while the name zhou was applied to common prefectures. By Ming and Qing dynasties, however, most prefectures under provinces had become known as fu. After the establishment of the Republic of China in 1912, the fu-level administrative divisions were streamlined.

Tang dynasty
(1st) Province-level division: "Circuit" (dào)
Total: 9 cities

Song dynasty
(1st) Province-level division: "Circuit" (lù)
Total: 45 cities

Northern Song

Southern Song

Liao dynasty
(1st) Province-level division: "Circuit" (dào)
Total: 13 cities

Jin dynasty
(1st) Province-level division: "Circuit" (lù)
Total: 30 cities

Western Xia
(1st) Province-level division: "Prefecture" (zhōu)
Total: 4 cities

Yuan dynasty
(1st) Province-level division: "Province" (xíngzhōngshūshěng)
Total: 30 cities

Ming dynasty
(1st) Province-level division: "Province" (shěng)
Total: 183 cities

Qing dynasty
(1st) Province-level division: "Province" (shěng)
Total: 218 cities

References

Former prefectures of China